Turdoides is a genus of passerine birds in the laughingthrush family Leiothrichidae. The species are distributed across Africa and southern Asia and are typically fairly large, long-tailed birds which forage in noisy groups. The majority of species have drab brown or grey-brown plumage. Several species that were included in Turdoides in the past have been reassigned to Argya following a 2018 study that found multiple clades.

The genus Turdoides was introduced in 1826 by the German physician Philipp Jakob Cretzschmar specifically for the white-headed babbler. The name combines the thrush genus Turdus with the Ancient Greek -oidēs meaning "resembling".

Species
The genus contains the following 19 species:

 Brown babbler, Turdoides plebejus
 Bare-cheeked babbler, Turdoides gymnogenys
 Arrow-marked babbler, Turdoides jardineii
 Scaly babbler, Turdoides squamulata
 White-rumped babbler, Turdoides leucopygia
 White-headed babbler, Turdoides leucocephala
 Blackcap babbler, Turdoides reinwardtii
 Dusky babbler, Turdoides tenebrosa
 Southern pied babbler, Turdoides bicolor
 Northern pied babbler, Turdoides hypoleuca
 Black-lored babbler, Turdoides sharpei
 Black-faced babbler, Turdoides melanops
 Hartlaub's babbler, Turdoides hartlaubii
 Hinde's babbler, Turdoides hindei
 Spiny babbler, Turdoides nipalensis
 White-throated mountain babbler, Turdoides gilberti – previously in Kupeornis
 Red-collared babbler, Turdoides rufocinctus – previously in Kupeornis
 Chapin's babbler,	Turdoides chapini – previously in Kupeornis
 Capuchin babbler, Turdoides atripennis – previously in monotypic Phyllanthus

References

 Collar, N. J. & Robson C. 2007. Family Timaliidae (Babblers)  pp. 70 – 291 in; del Hoyo, J., Elliott, A. & Christie, D.A. eds. Handbook of the Birds of the World, Vol. 12. Picathartes to Tits and Chickadees. Lynx Edicions, Barcelona.

 
Bird genera
Leiothrichidae
Taxonomy articles created by Polbot
Taxa named by Philipp Jakob Cretzschmar